Bankura Sammilani College, established in 1948, is one of the oldest colleges in Bankura district. It offers undergraduate courses in arts, commerce and sciences. It is the first National Assessment and Accreditation Council (NAAC) accredited college in Bankura District with B+.Bankura University

History
Bankura Sammilani College is established to promote the higher education in Bankura and its neighbour districts by Bankura Sammilani Registered Society. With an aim to provide a platform for higher education to the financially weaker peoples of Bankura it started its journey on 1 September 1948 with 100 students (boys) and 6 teachers of intermediate science. Initially it was only for boys but its status changed to co-education from the session 1992–1993. From its inception it was a trust college and became govt-aided college on 22 April 1977.

Affiliation and accreditation
The college was initially under the affiliation of calcutta university from 6 August 1948. It comes under the affiliation of Burdwan University in 1960. The college is recognised by the University Grants Commission (UGC).

Shifts
In the initial days it runs in three shifts. B.Com(introduced in 1959) in evening shift, B.A (introduced in 1970) in morning and BSc(introduced in 1959) in day shift. Currently the college runs in two shifts.B.Com courses are being taught in morning shift and all B.A and BSc courses are in day shift.

Departments
Currently 16 different honours courses in Arts, Science and Commerce are being taught in the college.

Science

Arts

Commerce
The college has commerce Department.

Extra activities
The college has taken some initiative for students benefit. The college provides opportunity for Spoken English classes with the help of BBC Bankura Branch. It has Computer Literacy Program with Webel Informatics Limited from 1996. The college also provides opportunities to pursue different courses with the help of Institute of Cost and Works Accountants of India from March 2009

See also

References

External links
Bankura Sammilani College 

Colleges affiliated to Bankura University
Educational institutions established in 1948
Universities and colleges in Bankura district
1948 establishments in West Bengal